Russell Thomas is an American operatic tenor. He has performed leading roles at some of the world's leading opera houses, including the Metropolitan Opera, Los Angeles Opera, Lyric Opera of Chicago,  the English National Opera, Deutsche Oper Berlin, and the Royal Opera House, Covent Garden, among others.

Early life
Born in Miami, Florida, Thomas did not discover his voice until the age of 18, when a voice teacher suggested he could make a career out of singing. He went on to study music at conservatory, and sang in the chorus of Miami Opera as an undergraduate. Thomas went on to be a young artist with Seattle Opera Young Artist Program,  the Florida Grand Opera, the Opera Theatre of Saint Louis, and  Sarasota Opera.

Career
He has sung the role of Tito in Mozart's La clemenza di Tito and Rodolfo in Puccini's La Boheme at the Metropolitan Opera, and at the Royal Opera House, Covent Garden he appeared as Gabriele Adorno in Verdi's Simon Boccanegra. He is the Artist in Residence for the Los Angeles Opera until 2024.

Personal life
Thomas is an openly gay man who became a father through adoption.

References

External links
 Official Website

20th-century American male opera singers
21st-century African-American male singers
African-American male opera singers
American operatic tenors
Living people
Musicians from Miami
Singers from Florida
Year of birth missing (living people)
LGBT African Americans